Carlo Gualandri (1895–1972) was an Italian film actor.

Selected filmography
 Nemesis (1920)
 The Knot (1921)
 The Last Days of Pompeii (1926)
 Miryam (1929)
 The Man with the Claw (1931)
 The Devil's Lantern (1931)

References

Bibliography 
 Ágnes Pethő. The Cinema of Sensations. Cambridge Scholars Publishing, 2015.

External links 
 

1895 births
1972 deaths
Italian male film actors
Italian male silent film actors
20th-century Italian male actors
Male actors from Rome